The men's 4 × 100 metres relay event at the 1987 Pan American Games was held in Indianapolis, United States on 16 August.

Results

References

Athletics at the 1987 Pan American Games
1987